Todd Souza (born December 13, 1964) is an American professional stock car racing driver who competes full-time in the ARCA Menards Series West and part-time in the ARCA Menards Series, driving the No. 13 Ford for his team, Central Coast Racing. He has also driven in what is now the NASCAR Xfinity Series, making two starts in 2007, and part-time in what is now the ARCA Menards Series East.

Racing career

He attempted to make his debut in the NASCAR Busch Series (now the Xfinity Series) in 2005 at the series' inaugural race at the Autódromo Hermanos Rodríguez road course in Mexico City. Fielding his own No. 97 Chevrolet, Souza failed to qualify. He returned later that year at the other road course on the schedule, Watkins Glen, and did not qualify again. After not entering any races in 2006, Souza returned to the Busch Series in 2007, again at Mexico City, but now using the No. 13, his West Series car number. Unlike two years earlier, he made the field this time. After finishing a solid 23rd in his debut, he attempted one other race that year, Phoenix in November, where he successfully qualified for the race but crashed out and finished 40th. That race is his last start in the series to date.

Souza has competed in NASCAR's West Series since 2006. He has one career win in the series, coming at Miller Motorsports Park in Utah in 2008. He completed his first full-time season in 2017 before scaling back to part-time for the 2018 season.

Souza's 2019 season was highlighted by two top-three finishes: a third-place run at Colorado National Speedway (his first podium in two years) and a runner-up finish at Meridian Speedway. He also made headlines at Gateway after on-track contact with Hailie Deegan, calling her "spoiled and rotten" and deeming her move "disrespectful."

Souza's crew chief is Michael Muñoz, who has worked with him since the late 2000s.

Motorsports career results

NASCAR
(key) (Bold – Pole position awarded by qualifying time. Italics – Pole position earned by points standings or practice time. * – Most laps led.)

Busch Series

K&N Pro Series East

ARCA Menards Series
(key) (Bold – Pole position awarded by qualifying time. Italics – Pole position earned by points standings or practice time. * – Most laps led. ** – All laps led.)

ARCA Menards Series West

 Season still in progress

References

External links
 

Living people
1964 births
Racing drivers from California
NASCAR drivers
ARCA Menards Series drivers
People from Watsonville, California